2015 college football season may refer to:

American leagues
2015 NCAA Division I FBS football season
2015 NCAA Division I FCS football season
2015 NCAA Division II football season
2015 NCAA Division III football season
2015 NAIA football season

Non-American leagues
2015 Japan college football season
2015 CIS football season